ABSTUDY is an Australian Government program that gives financial assistance to Aboriginal and Torres Strait Islander students and apprentices who are less than 24 years old through fortnightly payments.

See also
Austudy Payment,  Australian Government social security payment for students, paid under the Social Security Act 1991

References 

Welfare in Australia